Harris Rock is the largest and southernmost of a group of three rocks lying north of Montrol Rock and D'Urville Island, in the Joinville Island group, Antarctica. It is located 7 km northeast of Cape Juncal and 6.3 km northwest of Limoza Island. The name appears on an Argentine government chart of 1960. The rock is named after Capitan de Navio Santiago Harris of the Argentine Navy.

References

Rock formations of the Joinville Island group